Melittia pyropis is a moth of the family Sesiidae. It is known from Malawi, Somalia and South Africa.

References

Sesiidae
Moths of Sub-Saharan Africa
Lepidoptera of Malawi
Insects of Somalia
Moths described in 1919
Lepidoptera of South Africa